How to Destroy Angels is an American post-industrial band formed in 2009 by Nine Inch Nails members Trent Reznor and Atticus Ross alongside Reznor's wife Mariqueen Maandig and longtime Nine Inch Nails collaborator Rob Sheridan. The group is named after a 1984 Coil EP of the same name. Alessandro Cortini joined the lineup for the duration of the 2013 tour.

Releases 
The band's first release was a self-titled EP released on June 1, 2010. The band released a single from the album, "A Drowning", as digital downloadable content, and a second song, "The Space in Between," debuted as a music video on Pitchfork on May 14, 2010. A third track, "The Believers," was made available through Wired magazine's iPad application, along with a dissection and breakdown of the song, and through a free digital download from the official website. "The Believers", is also featured on the soundtrack of the 2011 film Limitless.

The band recorded a cover version of Bryan Ferry's "Is Your Love Strong Enough?" which was released December 9, 2011 on the soundtrack for The Girl with the Dragon Tattoo.

In November 2012, the band's second EP, An Omen EP was released on Columbia Records. The song "Keep It Together" from the EP was released as a single on October 9, 2012. A music video for the song was directed by the band themselves. Two other songs from An Omen EP were also given music videos: "Ice Age", directed by John Hillcoat, and "The Loop Closes", which was also directed by the band.

The band's debut studio album, Welcome Oblivion, was released on March 5, 2013 through Columbia Records. It included the tracks "Keep It Together", "Ice Age", "On the Wing", and "The Loop Closes" from An Omen EP. A deluxe edition of the album also included the How to Destroy Angels EP.

The first single from Welcome Oblivion, "How Long?", was released on January 31, 2013, along with a music video directed by Shynola.

Discography

Albums

Studio albums

EPs

Singles

Other appearances

Music videos

References

External links
 
 

Musical groups established in 2009
American industrial music groups
American electronic music groups
American experimental musical groups
Columbia Records artists
Musical quartets
Trent Reznor